Oleh Ivanovych Matushevskyi (born 19 February 1995) is a Ukrainian professional footballer who plays as a centre-back for Ukrainian club Prykarpattia Ivano-Frankivsk.

References

External links
 Profile on Prykarpattia Ivano-Frankivsk official website
 
 

1995 births
Living people
Sportspeople from Lviv
Ukrainian footballers
Association football defenders
FC Chornomorets Odesa players
Pogoń Lwów players
FC Sambir players
FC Lviv players
FC Kalush players
FC Karpaty Halych players
FC Prykarpattia Ivano-Frankivsk (1998) players
Ukrainian First League players
Ukrainian Second League players